Columbella adansoni is a species of sea snail, a marine gastropod mollusk in the family Columbellidae, the dove snails.

Description

Distribution

E' presente in areale relittuale disgiunto nelle coste centro africane e lungo le Azzorre.

References

Columbellidae
Gastropods described in 1853